Le jour de bonté (Den dobročinnosti, Day of Kindness H.194) is an unfinished 1931 opera in 3 acts for Paris by Bohuslav Martinů to a libretto by Georges Ribemont-Dessaignes.

Plot
Two French peasants visit Paris to perform good works for the needy but are frustrated and rejected by those they try to help.

Recording 

Martinů: Le Jour de Bonte Tomas Bijok, Lucas, Petr Matuszek, Nicolas, Irena Troupova. Pilsen Philharmonic Orchestra and Prague Chamber Choir, Milan Kanak Arco Diva 73min 2010

References

External links

Operas by Bohuslav Martinů
French-language operas
Operas
1931 operas
Unfinished operas